Indirect presidential elections were held for the first time in Finland in 1919. Although the country had declared Prince Frederick Charles of Hesse king on 9 October 1918, he renounced the throne on 14 December. The president was elected by Parliament, with Kaarlo Juho Ståhlberg of the National Progressive Party receiving 71.5% of the 200 votes.

Ståhlberg, a moderate, liberal and reformist politician, who favoured improving the material well-being of workers and other economically poor Finns, received the votes of Social Democrats, Agrarians and Progressives.  He also firmly supported the new Finnish Republic, and a parliamentary form of government with a strong president as a mediator and a political reserve for politically troubled times.  Mannerheim, an independent right-winger and monarchist, suspected the democratic, republican and parliamentary form of government of producing too partisan political leaders, and of working ineffectively during crises.  Ståhlberg favoured the signing of peace treaty between Finland and the Soviet Russia, while Mannerheim in the summer of 1919 strongly considered ordering the Finnish army to invade St. Petersburg to help the Russian Whites in that country's civil war.  Only the National Coalitioners and Swedish People's Party voted for Mannerheim in this presidential election.

Results

References

Presidential elections in Finland
President
Finland